Kleopas Hafeni Dumeni (born 3 October 1930, Oshituku, Nakayale, Ombalantu, Namibia) is a Namibian church leader and a bishop emeritus of the Evangelical Lutheran Church in Namibia.

Dumeni is the son of Paulus Monima yaDumeni yaHipetekwa (b. 1902) and Hileni Utumbontsezi yaShimooshili shaUpuma (b. 1909).

Dumeni went to school in Oluvango during 1935–45, then in the Nakayale Primary School during 1947–50, and in a vocational school in Oniipa during 1951–53 and in a school in Oshigambo during 1955–56. He studied theology in the Elim seminary during 1957–59.

Dumeni was consecrated a bishop by visiting Bishop Erkki Kansanaho from Tampere, Finland, in June 1979 at Ongwediva. Dumeni worked as the second bishop of the Evangelical Lutheran Church in Namibia during 1979–1991, and as the presiding bishop from 1992 until 2000, when he retired.

Dumeni has an honorary doctoral degree in theology from three universities:

Wartburg Theological Seminary, USA, 1979
University of Helsinki, Finland, 1990
Gettysburg College, Pennsylvania, USA, 1991

He was also given the Wittenburg Award in 1991 by the Luther Institute, Washington, D.C.

Dumeni was married to Aino yaGabriel yaHaileka in 1959. He has 5 sons and two daughters with her.

References

1930 births
People from Omusati Region
Namibian Lutheran clergy
20th-century Lutheran bishops
Ovambo people
Lutheran bishops in Africa
Living people